Vultureni may refer to several places in Romania:

 Vultureni, a commune in Bacău County
 Vultureni, a commune in Cluj County
 Vultureni, a village in Cireşu Commune, Brăila County
 Vultureni, a village in Unțeni Commune, Botoșani County

See also 
 Vulturu (disambiguation)
 Vulturești (disambiguation)